Bear River High School is a public high school in the Nevada Joint Union High School District in Grass Valley, California, United States. It is located across the street from Lake of the Pines. It had approximately 300 graduates in the 2006–2007 school year, for a 98.5% graduation rate. 52.1% completed CSU/UC prep. 90.6% of the students self-identified as white.

Its camaraderie-focused music program, a highlight of the school's culture is known for its successes in various competitions and school-based concerts, most notably, Fantasy of Stars, featuring many of its best musical groups. Its show group, Starlite, is also a unique attribute to Bear River High School, as it is a talented show choir, but with band members rather than a backing track. Bear River Music's motto is: "Improving the lives of audience member and performer alike through musical excellence, professionalism, and pride."

Its main rival is Colfax High School located in Colfax, and the annual Bear River vs. Colfax football game is a popular school event each year.

Notable alumni include professional skateboarder John Cardiel and Adrian Molina writer and co-director of Pixar's Coco.

References

External links 
 Nevada Joint Union High School District
 Bear River High School
 Bear River Music Program website

Public high schools in California
High schools in Nevada County, California
1986 establishments in California